Abu Bakr ibn Umar ibn Ibrahim ibn Turgut, sometimes suffixed al-Sanhaji or al-Lamtuni  (died  1087) was a chieftain of the Lamtuna Berber Tribe and Amir of the Almoravids from 1056 until his death. He is credited to have founded the Moroccan city of Marrakesh, and under his rule the heretic Barghawatas were destroyed. In 1076, he conquered Koumbi Saleh capital of the Ghana Empire, and is credited to have brought Islam in this Western Sub-Saharan Africa region. In November of 1087, Abu Bakr died of a poisoned arrow in Senegal.

Life

Abu Bakr ibn Umar was a member of the Banu Turgut, a clan of the Lamtuna Berbers. His brother, Yahya ibn Umar al-Lamtuni was the chieftain of the Lamtuna who, together with the Maliki teacher Abdallah ibn Yasin, launched the Almoravid (murabitūn) movement in the early 1050s.

Upon the death of Yahya ibn Umar in the spring of 1056 at the Battle of Tabfarilla, the spiritual leader Abdallah ibn Yasin appointed Abu Bakr as the new military commander of the Almoravids. That same year, Abu Bakr recaptured Sijilmassa from the Maghrawa of the Zenata confederation. The city had been taken earlier by Yahya, but subsequently lost; Abu Bakr recaptured it definitively for the Almoravids in late 1056.  

In order to ensure they did not lose Sijilmassa again, Abu Bakr launched a campaign to secure the roads and valleys of southern Morocco.  He immediately captured the Draa valley, then moved along the Wadi Nul (along the edge of the Anti-Atlas, picking up the adherence of the Sanhaja tribes of the Lamta and the Gazzula (Jazzula) to the Almoravid movement. Abu Bakr led the conquest of the Sous valley of southern Morocco, seizing the local capital of Taroudannt in 1057. By negotiation, Abdallah ibn Yasin secured an alliance with the Masmuda Berbers of the High Atlas, which allowed the Almoravids to cross the mountain range with little incident and seize the critical Zenata-ruled citadel of Aghmat in 1058 with little opposition.  Delighted at the apparent ease of their advance, Abdallah ibn Yasin ventured into the lands of the Berghwata of western Morocco with only a light escort and was promptly killed. Abu Bakr, who was then mopping up the area north of Aghmat, wheeled the Almoravid army around and conquered the Berghwata in a brutal campaign of revenge.

The death of the spiritual leader Abdallah ibn Yasin left the Almoravids under the sole command of Abu Bakr. Abu Bakr continued carrying out the Almoravid program without assuming the pretence of religious authority in himself.  Abu Bakr, like later Almoravid rulers, took up the comparatively modest title of amir al-Muslimin ("Prince of the Muslims"), rather than the caliphal amir al-Mu'minin ("Commander of the Faithful"). 

Abu Bakr married the wealthiest woman in Aghmat, Zaynab an-Nafzawiyyah, who helped him navigate the complicated politics of southern Morocco. But Abu Bakr, a rustic desert warrior, found crowded Aghmat and its courtly life stifling. In 1060/61, Abu Bakr and his Sanhaja lieutenants left the city and pitched their tents on the pastures along the Tensift River, setting up an encampment for their headquarters, as if they were back in the Sahara desert.  Stone buildings would eventually replace the tents, and the encampment would become the city of Marrakesh, an unusual-seeming city for the time, evocative of desert life with planted palms and an oasis-like feel.

Abu Bakr placed his cousin Yusuf ibn Tashfin in charge of Aghmat, and assigned him the responsibility of maintaining the front against the Zenata to the north. In a series of campaigns through the 1060s, while Abu Bakr held court in Marrakesh, Yusuf directed Almoravid armies against northern Morocco, reducing Zenata strongholds one by one. In 1070, the Moroccan capital of Fez finally fell to the Almoravids.  Discontent, however, had arisen in the Almoravid ranks, particularly among the desert clans back in the Sahara, who regarded these distant northern campaigns as expensive and pointless.  The Guddala tribe, who had earlier broken away from the Almoravid coalition, began urging other desert tribes to follow suit.  After the fall of Fez, feeling Morocco was now secure, Abu Bakr decided it was time to return to the Sahara to quell the dissension in the desert homelands. He placed Yusuf ibn Tashfin in charge of Morocco in his absence. As was common among the Sanhaja tribes before extended military campaigns, Abu Bakr divorced Zaynab before he left, advising her to marry Yusuf if she needed protection.

Having quelled the discontent back in the Sahara, Abu Bakr returned north to Morocco in 1072. But Yusuf ibn Tashfin had enjoyed his taste of power, and was reluctant to give it up. Pushed by his new wife, Zaynab, Yusuf met Abu Bakr in the plain of Burnoose (between Marrakesh and Aghmat) and, by negotiation (rather than force), persuaded him to abdicate the northern dominions to him. As a courtesy to his former leader, Yusuf kept Abu-Bakr's name on the Almoravid coinage until his death.

Abu Bakr returned to the Sahara desert to command the southern wing of the Almoravids. He launched a new set of campaigns against the dominions of the Ghana Empire in 1076 and is often credited with initiating the spread of Islam on the southern periphery of the Sahara. His campaigns are said to have gone as far as Mali and Gao.

Abu Bakr ibn Umar died in 1087, and his dominions were partitioned among his sons and nephews (the sons of Yahya) after his death.

Mauritanian oral tradition claims Abu Bakr was killed in a clash with the "Gangara" (Soninke Wangara of the Tagant Region of southern Mauritania), relating that he was struck down by an arrow from an old, blind Gangara chieftain in the pass of Khma (between the Tagant and Assab mountains, en route to Ghana). According to Wolof oral tradition, a Serer bowman named Amar Godomat killed him with his bow near lake Rzik (just north of the Senegal) (Godomat's name apparently originates with this death). It goes on to note that Abu Bakr left a pregnant Fula wife, Fâtimata Sal, who gave birth to a son, the legendary Amadou Boubakar ibn Omar, better known as Ndiadiane Ndiaye, who went on to found the Wolof kingdom of Waalo in the lower Senegal river.

See also 

Islamic empires
Serer people

References

Sources
Ibn Idhari, Al-bayan al-mughrib Part III, annotated Spanish translation by A. Huici Miranda, Valencia, 1963.
 N. Levtzion & J.F.P. Hopkins, Corpus of early Arabic sources for West African history, Cambridge University Press, 1981,  (reprint: Markus Wiener, Princeton, 2000). Contains English translations of extracts from medieval works dealing with the Almoravids; the selections cover some (but not all) of the information above.

Year of birth unknown
1087 deaths
Almoravid emirs
11th-century Berber people
Lamtuna
Almoravid generals